Kessleria caflischiella is a moth of the family Yponomeutidae. It is found in Switzerland, Austria and Italy.

The length of the forewings is 6.9–8.3 mm for males and 6.1–7.1 mm for females. The forewings are greyish white with light brown dusting. The hindwings are light grey. Adults are on wing from the beginning of July to the beginning of September.

The larvae feed on Saxifraga moschata. They live in a spinning (a shelter like the web of a spider).

References

Moths described in 1880
Yponomeutidae
Moths of Europe